Samuel Spencer may refer to:

 Samuel Spencer (North Carolina politician) (1734–1794), North Carolina judge, lawyer, and Revolutionary War colonel
 Samuel M. Spencer (1875–1960), politician on Hawaii island
 Samuel R. Spencer (1871–1961), American politician, Lieutenant Governor of Connecticut
 Samuel Spencer (railroad executive) (1847–1906), first president of the Southern Railway
 S. B. Spencer (1827–1901), mayor of Atlanta, Georgia
 Sam Spencer (1902–1987), English footballer 
 Samuel Reid Spencer Jr. (1919–2013), president of Davidson College
 Samuel A. Spencer, American politician in the Virginia House of Delegates
 Samuel Spencer (DC Commissioner) (1910-1997) President of the District of Columbia Board of Commissioners